Warruwi is a mostly Aboriginal community located on South Goulburn Island, off Arnhem Land, in the West Arnhem Region of the Northern Territory of Australia.

At the 2016 census, Warruwi and its surrounding outstations had a population of 389. There is a school, health clinic, arts centre and other facilities. FlyTiwi has a daily passenger flight to Darwin from the airport, while freight is carried on a barge which runs weekly.

The traditional owners of the Goulburn Islands are the Maung people, and languages spoken on the island include Mawng, Kunbarlang, Kunwinjku, Djambarrpuyngu and Galpu, as well as Australian English.

References 

Towns in the Northern Territory
Aboriginal communities in the Northern Territory